Emile Davenport Hirsch (born March 13, 1985) is an American actor. Notable film roles include The Girl Next Door (2004), Lords of Dogtown (2005), Alpha Dog (2006), Into the Wild (2007), Milk (2008), Lone Survivor (2013), The Autopsy of Jane Doe (2016), The Chinese Widow (2017), An Evening with Beverly Luff Linn (2018), and Once Upon a Time in Hollywood (2019).

Early life
Hirsch is of German Jewish, English, and Scots-Irish ancestry; he was born in the Palms section of Los Angeles. His mother, Margaret Esther (née Davenport), is a visual artist, teacher, and pop-up book designer, and his father, David Milton Hirsch, is an entrepreneur, manager, and producer. He has an older sister, Jennifer, and was raised in Los Angeles and Santa Fe, New Mexico, where he lived with his mother for several years. Hirsch attended at Alexander Hamilton High School where he studied in the Music program.

Career
Hirsch began acting on television roles in the late 1990s. He starred in the Showtime original film Wild Iris (2001), with Laura Linney and Gena Rowlands. He made his film debut for The Dangerous Lives of Altar Boys (2002) and next acted with Kevin Kline in The Emperor's Club (2002).

In 2004, Hirsch starred in The Girl Next Door. He starred with Jeff Daniels and Sigourney Weaver in the limited release Imaginary Heroes (2004). In 2005, Hirsch starred in Catherine Hardwicke's film Lords of Dogtown (2005) about a group of skaters in the 1970s and their role in the birth of skateboard culture. Hirsch played Jay Adams. He played a character based on a real-life drug dealer, Jesse James Hollywood, in Alpha Dog (2006).

Hirsch played Christopher McCandless in Into the Wild (2007). He lost 40 pounds for the role, which earned him a Screen Actors Guild nomination for best actor. Esquire said, "[Hirsch] creates a vivid, unforgettable character you at once admire and pity."

Hirsch had the title role in the Wachowskis' Speed Racer, which was released on May 9, 2008 and was a box office bomb. Hirsch played gay-rights activist Cleve Jones in Gus Van Sant's biopic Milk (2008). He also appeared in Ang Lee's Taking Woodstock (2009), based on a screenplay of the Elliot Tiber memoir Taking Woodstock. He then starred in the William Friedkin's 2011 southern gothic thriller Killer Joe.

In April 2011, he was cast in Oliver Stone's Savages, which was released in July 2012.

In 2012, Hirsch starred with Penélope Cruz in Venuto al Mondo, a film by Italian director Sergio Castellitto. In 2013, he was in Prince Avalanche, co-starring Paul Rudd.

Hirsch starred in The Motel Life, co-starring Dakota Fanning and Stephen Dorff, directed by the Polsky brothers. In 2013, he starred with Holliday Grainger, Holly Hunter, and William Hurt in the miniseries Bonnie & Clyde. Hirsch co-starred in the film Lone Survivor, based on the memoir of Navy SEAL Marcus Luttrell.

In February 2017, it was announced that Hirsch would star with Aubrey Plaza in the comedy An Evening with Beverly Luff Linn.

In May 2018, Hirsch became the new voice for character James Lake Jr. in the Netflix original DreamWorks show Trollhunters: Tales of Arcadia from Guillermo del Toro, replacing Anton Yelchin in its third season following his death in 2016. Hirsch continues to reprise the role of Jim in 3 Below, Wizards and Trollhunters: Rise of the Titans.

In 2019, Hirsch portrayed Hollywood hairdresser and Manson family victim Jay Sebring in the film Once Upon a Time in Hollywood.

Music 
On October 25, 2019, Hirsch released his first album under Hirsch called Mnemonic. Two of its songs, Tooth Fairy and Angels Will, were selected to be on the New Alt playlist on Spotify. KROQ DJ Megan Holiday also picked Mnemonic as one of her favorite albums of the year. After Mnemonic's release, Hirsch released the single "American Dreamin'", and on 2/14 released his new single "Casual Animal."

Hirsch has recently released five singles, "Remember Days When," (which he co-wrote with Foster The People's Mark Foster) and "Hard Hearts" (both on 03/13/20). He released Prisoners on 03/27/20 & "The Same Different" on 04/03/20, and then "Favors" on 05/08/20.  Both "Prisoners" and "Favors" were both put on Spotify's New Noise Playlist. "Favors" was also put on multiple playlists on Deezer, including #3 placement on "Seleccíon Editorial Mexico y Central America," one of Deezer's biggest playlists worldwide, with 6.7 million followers.

After releasing a couple of new singles over a year, Hirsch released his second album called Denihilism on March 12, 2021.

Personal life 
Hirsch resides in Los Angeles.

On October 27, 2013, Hirsch's first child was born, a boy named Valor. The child's mother is a woman Hirsch dated; however, they are no longer in a relationship.

Assault conviction 
On February 12, 2015, Hirsch was charged with aggravated assault after attacking and strangling Paramount Pictures executive Daniele Bernfeld on January 25, 2015, at Tao Nightclub in Park City, Utah. Hirsch claimed he did not remember what had happened as the event happened when he was taking stimulants while inebriated. 

On August 17, 2015, he pleaded guilty to misdemeanor assault and was sentenced to 15 days in jail. He was also fined $4,750, received 90 days of probation, and was ordered to undergo 50 hours of community service. Hirsch entered a rehab facility following the assault.

Filmography

Film

Television

Video games

References

External links

 
 New York Observer Profile (2007)
Actor of the Year
Men's Journal 2009

1985 births
Living people
20th-century American male actors
21st-century American male actors
Alexander Hamilton High School (Los Angeles) alumni
American male child actors
American male film actors
American male television actors
American people convicted of assault
American people of English descent
American people of German descent
American people of Scotch-Irish descent
People from Topanga, California
People from Venice, Los Angeles